Vernot is a commune in the eastern French department of Côte-d'Or.

Population

See also
Communes of the Côte-d'Or department

References

Communes of Côte-d'Or